Leah Gottfried (born 1991) is an American Orthodox Jewish actress and filmmaker, best known for creating and starring in the web series Soon By You. In 2017, she was featured in The Jewish Week's "36 Under 36", an annual list of influential Jews under age 36.

Early life
Gottfried was born in 1991 in Monsey, New York, to a Haredi Orthodox Jewish family. After her parents divorced when she was five, she and her mother, Esther Litchfield-Fink, moved to Flatbush and transitioned to Modern Orthodox Judaism. Gottfried became interested in acting at age eight, and at 11 she began directing friends in recreations of her favorite TV episodes using her mother's camcorder. She attended local Orthodox schools, where she was discouraged by teachers from pursuing an acting career. Despite this, her mother was supportive and helped her audition for commercials, although she often ended up dropping out because shooting schedules conflicted with Shabbat; this motivated her to pursue writing and directing in order to set her own schedule for projects.

At age 14, Gottfried and her mother moved to Los Angeles and she began appearing in commercials for Yamaha ATV and Time Warner Cable, among others. She lived in Los Angeles for six years and attended Valley Torah High School. During the summer of 2005, she attended Kol Neshama, a summer arts conservatory for teen girls led by Orthodox filmmaker Robin Garbose; Garbose became a mentor to Gottfried, who later worked on her films The Heart That Sings (2011) and Operation: Candlelight (2014). She made her first major film appearance in the 2007 boxing comedy The Hammer, where she played a secretary.

After spending a post-high school year in Israel, Gottfried attended Yeshiva University's Stern College for Women, where she created a shaped major in film and became the school's first student to graduate with a Film Studies degree in 2014. She also took a cinematography course at New York University as part of this major.

Career
Gottfried founded her own production company, Dignity Entertainment, in 2011 while at Stern. After directing several music videos, most notably for Orthodox pop artist Shaindel Antelis, she directed, wrote, and produced the short film Angie's Song in 2014. She has also appeared onstage as Nora Morton in Brighton Beach Memoirs, Gert in Lost in Yonkers, and Anna in The Government Inspector. She had a brief role in the 2021 Jewish dance comedy film Tango Shalom.

Soon By You 

In 2016, Gottfried created the YouTube comedy web series Soon By You. Conceiving of the show as a combination of Friends and Srugim centered around Orthodox singles navigating the shidduch system in New York, Gottfried developed the show with producers Danny Hoffman and Jessica Schechter; all three also star in the series. The pilot episode, "The Setup", won Best Short at the 2016 Washington Jewish Film Festival, and the first season received over a million views on YouTube.

Personal life 
Gottfried is married to Isaiah Rothstein, a rabbi and musician who is the lead singer for the band Zayah and rabbi-in-residence at Hazon. The two met at a Hevria open-mic night event in late 2017 where both were performing (her reading a poem, him performing music); she later attended a talk he gave at the 2018 Limmud NY conference in Monsey and co-directed a music video for his band Zayah, and he eventually proposed to her via song later that year. The two were married on June 16, 2019 at Oz Farm in Saugerties, New York.

She has cited Rama Burshtein, Greta Gerwig, and Ava DuVernay as directing influences, particularly noting DuVernay for how she “brings stories about people who are marginalized to the forefront”.

Filmography

Film and TV

Music videos

References

External links

1991 births
Living people
Actresses from New York (state)
American music video directors
American women film directors
Artists from Brooklyn
Filmmakers from New York (state)
Jewish American actresses
Orthodox Jewish feminists
People from Monsey, New York